The Disability flag, Overcoming flag or Flag of the Rights of Persons with Disabilities is a flag that represents people who have disabilities. It was created by the Valencian dancer Eros Recio in 2017 and then presented to the United Nations. The flag is meant for general use, particularly at disability-centered events. It has been used at the International Day of Persons with Disabilities.

Design and Meaning 
The flag is intended to represent people with disabilities, their struggle for rights, and related concepts including the disability pride movement and the Paralympic Games.

The flag is a tricolour flag with three equally-sized horizontal stripes of gold, silver, and bronze. These colours are meant to evoke the three medals at the Paralympic Games, and are intended to represent the collective's overcoming of obstacles, rather than the competitive and meritocratic sentiments related to the event itself. For example, discriminatory adversities imposed by society, the victory of new rights achieved for the collective, and a celebration of increased awareness of inequality. According to Recio, the three colours also represent the different forms of disability. However, the meanings of these colours are intended to be decided by the collective community they represent.

History 
On December 3, 2017, at the United Nations' International Day of Persons with Disabilities, parliamentarians from Latin American countries gathered in a plenary assembly in Peru. By acclamation, they declared the flag to be the symbol of all people with disabilities. On the same day, the flag was handed over to the European headquarters of the United Nations. Many Spanish cities and municipalities display the flag on the International Day of People with Disabilities. In 2018, the flag was shown in the city of Santa Cruz de La Palma on the Canary Island of La Palma. On December 3, 2018, the flag was adopted by the "Foment d'Esportistes amb Reptes" (FER), an Olympic and Paralympic sports organization in Spain.

Influence of "Disability Pride" 

The Disability Pride flag represents the Disability Pride Movement. Its origin is from English-speaking countries, where the movement's presence is greater. The original Disability Pride flag was created in 2019 by Ann Magill, a disabled woman, and featured a zig-zag or lightning bolt design but after receiving input from people with visually triggering disabilities on Tumblr, the flag was changed in 2021 to have muted colors and straight diagonal stripes. The Disability Pride flag is in the public domain under a Creative Commons CC0 1.0 Universal (CC0 1.0) licence. Certain events and celebrations include Disability Pride Month, Disability Pride Week, and the parades for both events.

The movement has its roots in pride awareness events for other minority communities. The concept and design of the Disability Pride Flag were also inspired and influenced by social movements such as the LGBT+ community, LGBT pride, and Black pride.

The first Disability Pride Parade in the United States was held in Boston, Massachusetts, in 1990. Since then, disability pride parades have spread throughout the country. Parades have also occurred in Norway, the United Kingdom, South Korea, and Germany.

The Chicago Disability Pride Parade outlines these goals in its statement:

Change the way people think and define "disability".
Break and end internalized shame among people with disabilities.
Promote the idea in society that disability is a natural and fundamental part of human diversity that people living with disabilities can be proud of.

These ideas inspired the flag that is meant to represent the collective in a universal and globalized way, not just at Disability Pride events.

Relationship with Eros Recio 

According to Eros Recio, the flag is designed with the colors of three metals: gold, silver, and bronze. These are meant to represent the three main types of disability: physical, mental (intellectual or psychosocial), and sensory. The flag and its design have a general nature, meaning that each color does not exclusively represent a specific type of disability, but rather all of them as a whole. Nor does it mean that it excludes other forms of disability, such as visceral disability, or multiple disabilities. It is important to mention that no color is considered more important than another.

On December 12, 2019, Eros Recio participated in an official act of the College of High Silk Art of Valencia, in which a Disability Flag made of silk was added to the exhibition. On this occasion, Recio reiterated his statement in a speech that this flag represents all people with disabilities.

During the act, the incorporation of a new definition for the flag was mentioned: "Flag of Overcoming". This was to highlight the vindictive character of the term "disability" and avoid possible social segregation typical of ableism.

In addition, some small banners have been given in recognition of this social work to Vicente Genovés, President of the Great College of Silk Art; José María Chiquillo, President of the UNESCO Silk Routes International Network, representatives of organizations of people with disabilities such as the Roig Alfonso Foundation or Aspaym CV, and the writer Carmen Carrasco.

See also 
 Disability 
 Disability Pride Month
 Disability rights movement 
 Disability Studies 
 Disability in the arts 
 Mad Pride
 People-first language

References 

Activism flags
Flags introduced in 2017
Disability rights